Macrenches eurybatis is a moth of the family Gelechiidae. It was described by Edward Meyrick in 1904. It is found in Australia, where it has been recorded from Western Australia, the Northern Territory, Queensland and New South Wales.

The forewings are whitish ochreous, with purplish-silvery reflections and a broad dark bronzy-fuscous median longitudinal streak throughout, edged above by a shining white streak, beneath rather undefined posteriorly. The hindwings are pale grey.

References

Moths described in 1904
Thiotrichinae